The Peoples' Democratic Congress (HDK) is a union of numerous left-wing political movements, organisations and parties in Turkey that aims to fundamentally recreate Turkish politics and represent oppressed, exploited individuals who face ethnic, religious or gender discrimination. The Congress is anti-capitalist and was formed on 15 October 2011. It organises numerous conferences and holds official congresses. In 2012, the Congress established a new party that would act as its political wing, the Peoples' Democratic Party (HDP). A similar union of left-wing groups, the United June Movement, was formed in 2014.

Formation
In preparation for the 2011 general election, the Peace and Democracy Party (BDP) and several smaller parties fielded joint candidates as independents, under the 'Labour, Democracy and Freedom Bloc' banner. The purpose was to by-pass the 10% election threshold needed by parties to gain representation in the Grand National Assembly. 35 of the 61 candidates that ran under the Bloc were elected. After the election, these parties came together with smaller LGBT rights movements and others to form the Peoples' Democratic Congress in October 2011, with Ertuğrul Kürkçü and Sebahat Tuncel as the spokesman and spokeswoman respectively.

Aims
The Congress aims to provide a platform for oppressed and exploited individual as well as minorities facing religious or ethnic discrimination. The Congress also is strongly in favour of women's rights and thus operates a co-leader system with one male and one female spokesperson. The Congress aims to represent Kurdish minority in particular and is critical of the lack of constitutional enshrinement of minority rights. Other minorities that the Congress aims to represent are Alevis, Armenians, Assyrians, Azerbaijanis, Circassians, Laz, the LGBT community and Romani. The Congress is heavily critical of capitalism and what they see as the exploitation of workers.

Politically, the Congress is democratic socialist and has its political interests represented by the Peoples' Democratic Party. The Democratic Regions Party is also affiliated with the Congress but runs for local government positions in the Kurdish majority south-east only.

Participants

78'ers Initiative
Confederation of Revolutionary Trade Unions of Turkey
Cam Keramik İş

Limter İş

Democracy and Freedom Movement (DÖH)
Democratic Free Women's Movement (DÖKH)
Democratic Pomak Movement
Democratic Regions Party (DBP)
Free Democratic Alevi Movement
Global Action Group (KEG)
Green Left Party
Hevi LGBTİ
 Democratic Islamic Congress

Kaldıraç
Kaos Gay and Lesbian Cultural Research and Solidarity Association (KAOS GL)
Labour Party (EMEP)
Marxist Attitude
Munzur Protection Board

Partizan
Rainbow Women's Association
Revolutionary Socialist Workers' Party (DSİP)
Social Freedom Party (TÖP)
Socialist Party of the Oppressed (ESP)
Socialist Refoundation Party (SYKP)
 (SODAP)
Solidarity with the Palestinian People (FHDD)
Teori Politika
Theory and Society: Kurdish Studies
Tüm Köy Sen
Turkey Truth
Voice of Labor

In addition, Socialist Alternative is not a participant in the HDK but is broadly supportive of it.

See also
United June Movement
Peoples' United Revolutionary Movement

External links
A full list of the Congress members

References

 
2011 establishments in Turkey